Artis Lazdiņš (born 3 May 1986) is a Latvian professional footballer who plays as a midfielder for German club Greifswalder FC.

Club career

Early career

Artis Lazdiņš started playing football in his early childhood being taken to trainings to his local team FK Limbaži (coach: Valdis Matīss) by his father. In 2000 his family decided to move to the USA. He then continued playing football in an American-Ukrainian football (soccer) academy Chornomorets-USA in NYC. In 2004, after graduating from the Julia Richman High School, he returned to Latvia and played for FK Auda in Riga until the end of 2005.

FK Ventspils

In 2006 Lazdiņš was signed by FK Ventspils. In his first season in Ventspils Lazdiņš played for the reserve team and did not take part in the first-team action. In 2007 Lazdiņš had three appearances, not finding the net. In the next two years the number of appearances grew to 12 and 18, respectively. Lazdiņš became the champion of Latvia with FK Ventspils three times in a row - from 2006 to 2008. He also participated in the UEFA Europa League group stages in 2009. However, in 2009 the team's managers changed and Lazdiņš was no more needed within the squad, with his contract being terminated by a mutual agreement.

FK Jelgava

After leaving Ventspils Lazdiņš started looking for a club abroad but was then handed an offer by the Latvian Virsliga newcomers FK Jelgava. He signed a contract for one season and soon after joining became a first eleven player. In his first season there he played 24 matches and also managed to win the Latvian Cup. In January 2011 Lazdiņš extended his contract with FK Jelgava for another season. In August 2011 he went on trial with the Danish team Randers but did not stay with them, returning to Jelgava. All in all, Lazdiņš played 24 matches, scoring two goals in the 2011 season. The 2012 season started badly for Jelgava and having played 15 matches, Lazdiņš used the release clause of his contract in July 2012.

Piast Gliwice

In August 2012 Lazdiņš went on trial with the Polish Ekstraklasa club Piast Gliwice and signed a contract with them in September 2012. He scored his first goal for the club on 30 March 2013 in a 1–1 league match draw against Jagiellonia Białystok. The 2012-13 season, which was the debut season for Piast since the return to the Ekstraklasa, saw the club finish the league in the 4th position of the table, qualifying for the UEFA Europa League for the first time in the club's history. Lazdiņš participated in the second leg of the second qualifying round, when Piast played a 2–2 draw against the Azerbaijani club Qarabağ. In his second season with Piast Lazdiņš gradually lost his place in the starting line-up, playing just seven league and two cup matches for the club.

Return to FK Jelgava

On 26 March 2014, the return of Lazdiņš was officially confirmed by his former club FK Jelgava. Despite suffering from a long-term injury in the second half of the season, Lazdiņš participated in 18 league matches as well as the UEFA Europa League qualifiers, ceding to the Norwegian side Rosenborg over two legs in the first qualifying round of the tournament. He helped Jelgava win the Latvian Cup and reach bronze medals in the domestic championship for the first time in the club's history.

Saldus SS/Leevon
On 19 March 2020, Lazdiņš joined Latvin club Saldus SS/Leevon.

Greifswalder FC
In February 2022, Lazdiņš moved to German club Greifswalder FC of the fifth-tier NOFV-Oberliga Nord.

International career

Lazdiņš was a member of Latvia U-19 and Latvia U-21 football teams, being called up to the senior side for the Baltic Cup matches in 2010. He made his international debut in the second match of the tournament against Estonia on 19 June 2010. He then came on as a substitute, replacing Juris Laizāns. In 2012 Lazdiņš helped Latvia win the Baltic Cup, beating Finland in the final. Latvia won the Baltic Cup for the second time in a row in May 2014, beating Lithuania in the final. As of March 2015, Lazdiņš had played 21 matches for Latvia.

Personal life
According to fkjelgava.lv, Lazdiņš loves cinema and also has a Twitter account. His native language is Latvian, but he also speaks English fluently, Russian well and German at a basic level. His aim in football is to improve and reach career heights.

Honours
FK Ventspils
 Latvian league: 2006, 2007, 2008
 Latvian Cup: 2007

FK Jelgava
 Latvian Cup: 2010, 2014, 2015, 2016

Latvia
 Baltic Cup: 2012, 2014

References

External links
 
 
 

1986 births
Living people
People from Limbaži
Latvian footballers
Association football midfielders
Latvia international footballers
Ekstraklasa players
FK Auda players
FK Ventspils players
FK Jelgava players
Piast Gliwice players
Julia Richman Education Complex alumni
Latvian expatriate footballers
Latvian expatriate sportspeople in Poland
Expatriate footballers in Poland
Latvian expatriate sportspeople in Germany
Expatriate footballers in Germany